iCLA or ICLA can refer to
 Yamanashi Gakuin University's International College of Liberal Arts
 International Comparative Literature Association  
 Instituto Científico y Literario de Toluca
 Information, counselling and legal assistance in Norwegian Refugee Council
 International Cognitive Linguistics Association
 Institute for International and Comparative Law in Africa
 International Civil Liberties Alliance
 Indian Claims Limitations Act
 Initial Custody Level Assessment by Idaho Department of Juvenile Corrections

Also
 Icla Municipality in Bolivia
 Icla Formation